Jack Cook (born c. 1930) was a Canadian football player who played for the BC Lions. He played CIS football at Queen's University.

References

1930s births
Living people
Canadian football running backs
Queen's Golden Gaels football players
BC Lions players